The Sheild Professorship of Pharmacology is the senior professorship in pharmacology at the University of Cambridge. It is named in honour of Marmaduke Sheild.

The position was originally established on 7 June 1946 as a personal chair for the tenure of Ernest Basil Verney. On 11 March 1961 the professorship was re-established on a permanent basis.

List of Sheild Professors of Pharmacology
 1946–1962 Ernest Basil Verney
 1962–1971 Arnold Burgen
 1973–1978 Gustav Victor Rudolf Born
 1979–1999 Alan Cuthbert  
 1999–2013 Peter Anthony McNaughton
 2017 John Michael Edwardson

References

Pharmacology, Sheild
Pharmacology
Faculty of Biology, University of Cambridge
1961 establishments in England